{{DISPLAYTITLE:C8H10FN3O3S}}
The molecular formula C8H10FN3O3S (molar mass: 247.24 g/mol, exact mass: 247.0427 u) may refer to:

 Emtricitabine (FTC)
 Racivir

Molecular formulas